Condeellum ishiianum is a species of proturan in the family Protentomidae. It is found in Southern Asia.

Subspecies
These two subspecies belong to the species Condeellum ishiianum:
 Condeellum ishiianum ishiianum ImadatÃ©, 1965
 Condeellum ishiianum setosum ImadatÃ©, 1991

References

Protura
Articles created by Qbugbot
Animals described in 1965